The 2023 San Diego Padres season will be the 55th season of the San Diego Padres franchise. The Padres play their home games at Petco Park as members of Major League Baseball's National League West Division.

Offseason

Rule changes 
Pursuant to the CBA, new rule changes will be in place for the 2023 season:

 institution of a pitch clock between pitches;
 limits on pickoff attempts per plate appearance;
 limits on defensive shifts requiring two infielders to be on either side of second and be within the boundary of the infield; and
 larger bases (increased to 18-inch squares);

Regular season

Game Log

 
|- style="background: 
| 1 || March 30 || Rockies || – || || || — || || – ||
|- style="background: 
| 2 || March 31 || Rockies || – || || || — || || – ||
|- style="background: 
| 3 || April 1 || Rockies || – || || || — || || – ||
|- style="background: 
| 4 || April 2 || Rockies || – || || || — || || – ||
|- style="background: 
| 5 || April 3 || Diamondbacks || – || || || — || || – ||
|- style="background: 
| 6 || April 4 || Diamondbacks || – || || || — || || – ||
|- style="background: 
| 7 || April 6 || @ Braves || – || || || — || || – ||
|- style="background: 
| 8 || April 7 || @ Braves || – || || || — || || – ||
|- style="background: 
| 9 || April 8 || @ Braves || – || || || — || || – ||
|- style="background: 
| 10 || April 9 || @ Braves || – || || || — || || – ||
|- style="background: 
| 11 || April 10 || @ Mets || – || || || — || || – ||
|- style="background: 
| 12 || April 11 || @ Mets || – || || || — || || – ||
|- style="background: 
| 13 || April 12 || @ Mets || – || || || — || || – ||
|- style="background: 
| 14 || April 13 || Brewers || – || || || — || || – ||
|- style="background: 
| 15 || April 14 || Brewers || – || || || — || || – ||
|- style="background: 
| 16 || April 15 || Brewers || – || || || — || || – ||
|- style="background: 
| 17 || April 16 || Brewers || – || || || — || || – ||
|- style="background: 
| 18 || April 17 || Braves || – || || || — || || – ||
|- style="background: 
| 19 || April 18 || Braves || – || || || — || || – ||
|- style="background: 
| 20 || April 19 || Braves || – || || || — || || – ||
|- style="background: 
| 21 || April 20 || @ Diamondbacks || – || || || — || || – ||
|- style="background: 
| 22 || April 21 || @ Diamondbacks || – || || || — || || – ||
|- style="background: 
| 23 || April 22 || @ Diamondbacks || – || || || — || || – ||
|- style="background: 
| 24 || April 23 || @ Diamondbacks || – || || || — || || – ||
|- style="background: 
| 25 || April 25 || @ Cubs || – || || || — || || – ||
|- style="background: 
| 26 || April 26 || @ Cubs || – || || || — || || – ||
|- style="background: 
| 27 || April 27 || @ Cubs || – || || || — || || – ||
|- style="background: 
| 28 || April 29 || Giants* || – || || || — || || – ||
|- style="background: 
| 29 || April 30 || Giants* || – || || || — || || – ||
|-
|colspan="10"|*April 29 and 30 games played in Mexico City, Mexico
|- 
 

|- style="background: 
| 30 || May 1 || Reds || – || || || — || || – ||
|- style="background: 
| 31 || May 2 || Reds || – || || || — || || – ||
|- style="background: 
| 32 || May 3 || Reds || – || || || — || || – ||
|- style="background: 
| 33 || May 5 || Dodgers || – || || || — || || – ||
|- style="background: 
| 34 || May 6 || Dodgers || – || || || — || || – ||
|- style="background: 
| 35 || May 7 || Dodgers || – || || || — || || – ||
|- style="background: 
| 36 || May 9 || @ Twins || – || || || — || || – ||
|- style="background: 
| 37 || May 10 || @ Twins || – || || || — || || – ||
|- style="background: 
| 38 || May 11 || @ Twins || – || || || — || || – ||
|- style="background: 
| 39 || May 12 || @ Dodgers || – || || || — || || – ||
|- style="background: 
| 40 || May 13 || @ Dodgers || – || || || — || || – ||
|- style="background: 
| 41 || May 14 || @ Dodgers || – || || || — || || – ||
|- style="background: 
| 42 || May 15 || Royals || – || || || — || || – ||
|- style="background: 
| 43 || May 16 || Royals || – || || || — || || – ||
|- style="background: 
| 44 || May 17 || Royals || – || || || — || || – ||
|- style="background: 
| 45 || May 19 || Red Sox || – || || || — || || – ||
|- style="background: 
| 46 || May 20 || Red Sox || – || || || — || || – ||
|- style="background: 
| 47 || May 21 || Red Sox || – || || || — || || – ||
|- style="background: 
| 48 || May 23 || @ Nationals || – || || || — || || – ||
|- style="background: 
| 49 || May 24 || @ Nationals || – || || || — || || – ||
|- style="background: 
| 50 || May 25 || @ Nationals || – || || || — || || – ||
|- style="background: 
| 51 || May 26 || @ Yankees || – || || || — || || – ||
|- style="background: 
| 52 || May 27 || @ Yankees || – || || || — || || – ||
|- style="background: 
| 53 || May 28 || @ Yankees || – || || || — || || – ||
|- style="background: 
| 54 || May 30 || @ Marlins || – || || || — || || – ||
|- style="background: 
| 55 || May 31 || @ Marlins || – || || || — || || – ||
|- 
 

|- style="background: 
| 56 || June 1 || @ Marlins || – || || || — || || – ||
|- style="background: 
| 57 || June 2 || Cubs || – || || || — || || – ||
|- style="background: 
| 58 || June 3 || Cubs || – || || || — || || – ||
|- style="background: 
| 59 || June 4 || Cubs || – || || || — || || – ||
|- style="background: 
| 60 || June 5 || Cubs || – || || || — || || – ||
|- style="background: 
| 61 || June 6 || Mariners || – || || || — || || – ||
|- style="background: 
| 62 || June 7 || Mariners || – || || || — || || – ||
|- style="background: 
| 63 || June 9 || @ Rockies || – || || || — || || – ||
|- style="background: 
| 64 || June 10 || @ Rockies || – || || || — || || – ||
|- style="background: 
| 65 || June 11 || @ Rockies || – || || || — || || – ||
|- style="background: 
| 66 || June 13 || Guardians || – || || || — || || – ||
|- style="background: 
| 67 || June 14 || Guardians || – || || || — || || – ||
|- style="background: 
| 68 || June 15 || Guardians || – || || || — || || – ||
|- style="background: 
| 69 || June 16 || Rays || – || || || — || || – ||
|- style="background: 
| 70 || June 17 || Rays || – || || || — || || – ||
|- style="background: 
| 71 || June 18 || Rays || – || || || — || || – ||
|- style="background: 
| 72 || June 19 || @ Giants || – || || || — || || – ||
|- style="background: 
| 73 || June 20 || @ Giants || – || || || — || || – ||
|- style="background: 
| 74 || June 21 || @ Giants || – || || || — || || – ||
|- style="background: 
| 75 || June 22 || @ Giants || – || || || — || || – ||
|- style="background: 
| 76 || June 23 || Nationals || – || || || — || || – ||
|- style="background: 
| 77 || June 24 || Nationals || – || || || — || || – ||
|- style="background: 
| 78 || June 25 || Nationals || – || || || — || || – ||
|- style="background: 
| 79 || June 27 || @ Pirates || – || || || — || || – ||
|- style="background: 
| 80 || June 28 || @ Pirates || – || || || — || || – ||
|- style="background: 
| 81 || June 29 || @ Pirates || – || || || — || || – ||
|- style="background: 
| 82 || June 30 || @ Reds || – || || || — || || – ||
|- 
 

|- style="background: 
| 83 || July 1 || @ Reds || – || || || — || || – ||
|- style="background: 
| 84 || July 2 || @ Reds || – || || || — || || – ||
|- style="background: 
| 85 || July 3 || Angels || – || || || — || || – ||
|- style="background: 
| 86 || July 4 || Angels || – || || || — || || – ||
|- style="background: 
| 87 || July 5 || Angels || – || || || — || || – ||
|- style="background: 
| 88 || July 7 || Mets || – || || || — || || – ||
|- style="background: 
| 89 || July 8 || Mets || – || || || — || || – ||
|- style="background: 
| 90 || July 9 || Mets || – || || || — || || – ||
|-style="text-align:center; background:#bbcaff;"
| colspan="10"|93rd All-Star Game in Seattle, WA
|- style="background: 
| 91 || July 14 || @ Phillies || – || || || — || || – ||
|- style="background: 
| 92 || July 15  || @ Phillies || – || || || — || || – ||
|- style="background: 
| 93 || July 15  || @ Phillies || – || || || — || || – ||
|- style="background: 
| 94 || July 16 || @ Phillies || – || || || — || || – ||
|- style="background: 
| 95 || July 18 || @ Blue Jays || – || || || — || || – ||
|- style="background: 
| 96 || July 19 || @ Blue Jays || – || || || — || || – ||
|- style="background: 
| 97 || July 20 || @ Blue Jays || – || || || — || || – ||
|- style="background: 
| 98 || July 21 || @ Tigers || – || || || — || || – ||
|- style="background: 
| 99 || July 22 || @ Tigers || – || || || — || || – ||
|- style="background: 
| 100 || July 23 || @ Tigers || – || || || — || || – ||
|- style="background: 
| 101 || July 24 || Pirates || – || || || — || || – ||
|- style="background: 
| 102 || July 25 || Pirates || – || || || — || || – ||
|- style="background: 
| 103 || July 26 || Pirates || – || || || — || || – ||
|- style="background: 
| 104 || July 28 || Rangers || – || || || — || || – ||
|- style="background: 
| 105 || July 29 || Rangers || – || || || — || || – ||
|- style="background: 
| 106 || July 30 || Rangers || – || || || — || || – ||
|- style="background: 
| 107 || July 31 || @ Rockies || – || || || — || || – ||
|- 
 

|- style="background: 
| 108 || August 1 || @ Rockies || – || || || — || || – ||
|- style="background: 
| 109 || August 2 || @ Rockies || – || || || — || || – ||
|- style="background: 
| 110 || August 4 || Dodgers || – || || || — || || – ||
|- style="background: 
| 111 || August 5 || Dodgers || – || || || — || || – ||
|- style="background: 
| 112 || August 6 || Dodgers || – || || || — || || – ||
|- style="background: 
| 113 || August 7 || Dodgers || – || || || — || || – ||
|- style="background: 
| 114 || August 8 || @ Mariners || – || || || — || || – ||
|- style="background: 
| 115 || August 9 || @ Mariners || – || || || — || || – ||
|- style="background: 
| 116 || August 11 || @ Diamondbacks || – || || || — || || – ||
|- style="background: 
| 117 || August 12 || @ Diamondbacks || – || || || — || || – ||
|- style="background: 
| 118 || August 13 || @ Diamondbacks || – || || || — || || – ||
|- style="background: 
| 119 || August 14 || Orioles || – || || || — || || – ||
|- style="background: 
| 120 || August 15 || Orioles || – || || || — || || – ||
|- style="background: 
| 121 || August 16 || Orioles || – || || || — || || – ||
|- style="background: 
| 122 || August 17 || Diamondbacks || – || || || — || || – ||
|- style="background: 
| 123 || August 18 || Diamondbacks || – || || || — || || – ||
|- style="background: 
| 124 || August 19 || Diamondbacks || – || || || — || || – ||
|- style="background: 
| 125 || August 20 || Diamondbacks || – || || || — || || – ||
|- style="background: 
| 126 || August 21 || Marlins || – || || || — || || – ||
|- style="background: 
| 127 || August 22 || Marlins || – || || || — || || – ||
|- style="background: 
| 128 || August 23 || Marlins || – || || || — || || – ||
|- style="background: 
| 129 || August 25 || @ Brewers || – || || || — || || – ||
|- style="background: 
| 130 || August 26 || @ Brewers || – || || || — || || – ||
|- style="background: 
| 131 || August 27 || @ Brewers || – || || || — || || – ||
|- style="background: 
| 132 || August 28 || @ Cardinals || – || || || — || || – ||
|- style="background: 
| 133 || August 29 || @ Cardinals || – || || || — || || – ||
|- style="background: 
| 134 || August 30 || @ Cardinals || – || || || — || || – ||
|- style="background: 
| 135 || August 31 || Giants || – || || || — || || – ||
|- 
 

|- style="background: 
| 136 || September 1 || Giants || – || || || — || || – ||
|- style="background: 
| 137 || September 2 || Giants || – || || || — || || – ||
|- style="background: 
| 138 || September 3 || Giants || – || || || — || || – ||
|- style="background: 
| 139 || September 4 || Phillies || – || || || — || || – ||
|- style="background: 
| 140 || September 5 || Phillies || – || || || — || || – ||
|- style="background: 
| 141 || September 6 || Phillies || – || || || — || || – ||
|- style="background: 
| 142 || September 8 || @ Astros || – || || || — || || – ||
|- style="background: 
| 143 || September 9 || @ Astros || – || || || — || || – ||
|- style="background: 
| 144 || September 10 || @ Astros || – || || || — || || – ||
|- style="background: 
| 145 || September 11 || @ Dodgers || – || || || — || || – ||
|- style="background: 
| 146 || September 12 || @ Dodgers || – || || || — || || – ||
|- style="background: 
| 147 || September 13 || @ Dodgers || – || || || — || || – ||
|- style="background: 
| 148 || September 15 || @ Athletics || – || || || — || || – ||
|- style="background: 
| 149 || September 16 || @ Athletics || – || || || — || || – ||
|- style="background: 
| 150 || September 17 || @ Athletics || – || || || — || || – ||
|- style="background: 
| 151 || September 18 || Rockies || – || || || — || || – ||
|- style="background: 
| 152 || September 19 || Rockies || – || || || — || || – ||
|- style="background: 
| 153 || September 20 || Rockies || – || || || — || || – ||
|- style="background: 
| 154 || September 22 || Cardinals || – || || || — || || – ||
|- style="background: 
| 155 || September 23 || Cardinals || – || || || — || || – ||
|- style="background: 
| 156 || September 24 || Cardinals || – || || || — || || – ||
|- style="background: 
| 157 || September 25 || @ Giants || – || || || — || || – ||
|- style="background: 
| 158 || September 26 || @ Giants || – || || || — || || – ||
|- style="background: 
| 159 || September 27 || @ Giants || – || || || — || || – ||
|- style="background: 
| 160 || September 29 || @ White Sox || – || || || — || || – ||
|- style="background: 
| 161 || September 30 || @ White Sox || – || || || — || || – ||
|- style="background: 
| 162 || October 1 || @ White Sox || – || || || — || || – ||
|-

Season standings

National League West

National League Wild Card

Current roster

Farm system

References

External links 
 San Diego Padres official site
 2023 San Diego Padres at baseball-reference.com

San Diego Padres seasons
San Diego Padres
San Diego Padres